The buildings and architecture of Allentown, Pennsylvania reflect the city's history and settlement from its original settlement in the 1700s through the present. Allentown is characterized by its abundant historic homes, churches, commercial structures and century-old industrial buildings. Some of its homes and building structures rank among the nation's oldest.

18th and 19th centuries
Allentown was founded in 1762. In the late 18th century, architecture made of brick and stone was not uncommon. Trout Hall, built in 1770 by James Allen, son of city founder William Allen, is the oldest standing house in Allentown.  Located at South 4th Street and Walnut Street, the home was later known as the Livingston Mansion and in 1848 became the Allentown Seminary. In 1867 it housed the original premises of Muhlenberg College. Restored in 1905, Trout Hall is currently administered by the Lehigh County Historical Society. Miller Symphony Hall, at 23 North Sixth Street in Center City Allentown, was constructed in 1896.

Zion's Reformed United Church of Christ, founded in 1762, is located at 620 West Hamilton Street. The church's original structure was a log cabin Union Church it shared with the congregation of St. Paul's Lutheran.  Zion's current building, a neo-gothic structure built in the 1880s, hosts a sanctuary representing a high point in 19th-century church architecture, with stained glass art windows on all four walls interweaving biblical symbols with a floral motif, symbolizing the flowering of the new out of the old.

Zion's also hosts the Liberty Bell Museum, due to the special role the church played in protecting the Liberty Bell from capture by British forces in 1777.  The Liberty Bell was hidden in Zion's basement, where the foundations of the 18th-century church can be seen to this day.

There are three historic districts in Allentown, Old Allentown, the Old Fairgrounds and West Park neighborhoods. Old Allentown and Old Fairgrounds are Center City neighborhoods that hold a joint house tour organized by Old Allentown Preservation Association (OAPA) once a year in September. The West Park neighborhood also offers a tour of this district's larger Victorian and Craftsman-style homes.

20th century
In the 20th century, rowhomes, many built in the Victorian or Federal style, became popular in Allentown as in other industrial cities.  The West End neighborhood, running roughly from 15th Street to Cedar Crest Boulevard, is famous for both its brick twin styles closer to the city center and large homes, including the Hess Mansion, further west.

The PPL Building, constructed between 1926 and 1928, is Allentown's tallest building at 322 feet (98 m). It is 23 stories high and is located at the northwest corner of 9th and Hamilton Street. A Lehigh Valley icon, this Art Deco tower can be seen from places throughout the Lehigh Valley; in clear weather, the tower can be seen as far north as Blue Mountain. The building was designed by architect and skyscraper pioneer Harvey Wiley Corbett (who would later have a hand in designing New York's Rockefeller Center) and was supervised by his assistant, Wallace Harrison (who would later design Lincoln Center, LaGuardia Airport and the U.N. Headquarters Building). The building exterior features bas reliefs by Alexander Archipenko. 

In 1930, the PPL Building was named the "best example of a modern office building" by Encyclopædia Britannica and was featured as having the world's fastest elevator. Exterior shots of Allentown's PPL Building are featured in the 1954 movie Executive Suite.

21st century

As of the early 21st century, much of Allentown's office and retail space is vacant. In December 2011, J.B. Reilly, Alvin H. Butz and other developers announced a series of new plans designed to bring service-based companies and white-collar workers back to the city while taking advantage of a special tax zone created for the construction of the new PPL Center at 7th and Hamilton Streets.

In recent years some historic industrial buildings have been converted to loft-style rental apartments. These include the Farr Lofts in Center City, the P&P Mill Building in the 1st Ward and Auburn Station near the Good Shepherd Rehabilitation Center.

Tallest buildings in the Lehigh Valley
The tallest buildings and structures in the Lehigh Valley (metro Allentown) are:

See also
Allentown, Pennsylvania
Lehigh Valley

References

External link
"Architecture in the Lehigh Valley", Lehigh Valley Marketplace
"Historical Allentown", AllentownPA.gov

Buildings and architecture
Allentown
Buildings and structures in Allentown, Pennsylvania